Insaniyat ( Humanity) is a 1955 Hindi-language action film produced and directed by S. S. Vasan. The film stars Dilip Kumar, Dev Anand and Bina Rai. The film's songs were written by Rajendra Krishan. The film's music is by C. Ramchandra. It is a remake of 1950 Telugu film Palletoori Pilla and is the only film to feature Kumar and Anand together onscreen. Insaniyat was a blockbuster at box office. The film also features a chimpanzee named Zippy whose camaraderie with Kumar was its main attraction.

Plot
A once loyal soldier faces many challenges after turning into a rebel.

Cast
 Dilip Kumar as Mangal 
 Dev Anand as Bhanupratap
 Bina Rai as Durga
 Vijayalakshmi as Chanda
 Jayant as Zangoora
 Jairaj as Martand
 Shobhna Samarth as Mangal's Mother
 Badri Prasad as Durga's Father
 Kumar as Vaidji
 Agha as Bhola
 Mohana as Chameli
 T. Mukherjee as Madhav
 Ishwarlal as Spy
 G. V. Sharma as Spy
 Vijay Rao as a Villager
 G. Bhatt as Employee
 Gemini Boys and Girls
 Zippy as Zippo

Production 
Insaniyat was a remake of the 1950 Telugu film Palletoori Pilla, and remained the only film where Dilip Kumar and Dev Anand worked together.

Soundtrack
All music was composed by C. Ramchandra and lyrics were by Rajendra Krishan.

References

External links 
 

1950s action films
1950s Hindi-language films
1955 films
Films directed by S. S. Vasan
Films scored by C. Ramchandra
Gemini Studios films
Hindi remakes of Telugu films
Indian action films
Indian black-and-white films